Metalectra albilinea, the white-lined fungus moth, is a species of moth in the family Erebidae. It is found in North America.

The MONA or Hodges number for Metalectra albilinea is 8504.

References

Further reading

 
 
 

Boletobiinae
Articles created by Qbugbot
Moths described in 1941